Pafnucio Santo is a 1977 Mexican drama film directed by Rafael Corkidi. The film was selected as the Mexican entry for the Best Foreign Language Film at the 50th Academy Awards, but was not accepted as a nominee.

Cast
 Juan Barrón as Adán / Jesuscristo / revolucionario
 Pablo Corkidi as Pafnucio
 Susana Kamini as Patricia Hearst
 Gina Morett as demonio / china poblana / Emiliano Zapata
 Elpidia Carrillo (credited as "Piya") as Malinche
 Jorge Humberto Robles as Hernán Cortés / mensajero / juez / Romeo / revolucionario
 Sebastián as voceador
 José Luis Urquieta as soldier
 María de la Luz Zendejas as Frida Kahlo / Sor Juana Inés de la Cruz / Capitán

See also
 List of submissions to the 50th Academy Awards for Best Foreign Language Film
 List of Mexican submissions for the Academy Award for Best Foreign Language Film

References

External links
 
 

1977 films
1977 drama films
1970s Spanish-language films
Mexican drama films
Films directed by Rafael Corkidi
Films about Emiliano Zapata
1970s Mexican films